Taherhuda Union is a union parishad situated at Harinakunda Upazila,  in Jhenaidah District, Khulna Division of Bangladesh. There are 18 villages and 18 Dj_elgato

References

External links
 

Unions of Khulna Division
Unions of Harinakunda Upazila
Unions of Jhenaidah District